The Copeland Islands are members of the Canadian Arctic Archipelago in the territory of Nunavut. They are located in western Gulf of Boothia at the mouth of Thom Bay, east of the Boothia Peninsula. The Martin Islands are to the north; the Hecla and Fury Islands are to the east.

References 

Islands of the Gulf of Boothia
Uninhabited islands of Kitikmeot Region